Lee B. Perry (born August 10, 1966 in Brigham City, Utah) is an American politician and a Republican member of the Utah House of Representatives representing District 29 since January 1, 2013.

Early life and education
Perry was born in Brigham City, Utah, and attended Columbia College, where he received his B.A. in criminal justice administration in 1999. He was also certified as police officer in 1990. He has worked for the Utah Highway Patrol/Department of Public Safety since 1998. He and his wife, Kathlyn, have four children.

Political career
Perry was first elected on November 2, 2010.

During the 2016 general legislative session, he served on the Natural Resources, Agriculture, and Environmental Quality Appropriations Subcommittee, as the committee chair of the House Natural Resources, Agriculture, and Environment Committee, and on the House Government Operations Committee.

Elections
2014 Perry faced Democratic Party nominee Alan Yorgason in the general election, winning with 5,588 votes (77.82%) to Yorgason's 1,593 (22.18%).
2012 Redistricted to District 29, and with incumbent Democratic Representative Janice Fisher redistricted to District 30, Perry and incumbent Representative Brad Galvez, who had been redistricted from District 6, were opponents for the June 26, 2012 Republican primary, which Perry won with 2,387 votes (60.7%); Perry won the November 6, 2012 general election with 11,525 votes (79.8%) against Democratic nominee Heidi Bitton.
2010 Perry challenged incumbent Republican Representative Ben Ferry and was chosen by the Republican convention for the November 2, 2010 general election; Perry won with 7,160 votes (80.2%) against Constitution Party candidate Becky Maddox.

2016 sponsored legislation

Perry passed five of the nine bills he introduced, giving him a 55.6% passage rate. He also floor sponsored six Senate bills during the 2016 legislative session.

References

External links
Official page at the Utah State Legislature
Campaign site
Lee B. Perry at Ballotpedia
Lee B. Perry at OpenSecrets

1966 births
Living people
American state police officers
Republican Party members of the Utah House of Representatives
People from Brigham City, Utah
People from Box Elder County, Utah
21st-century American politicians